Laurence Minot may refer to:

 Laurence Minot (poet) (1300–1352), English poet
 Laurence Minot (RFC officer) (1896–1917), British World War I flying ace